Robin Tranberg (born 6 February 1993) is a Swedish professional footballer who plays for Varbergs BoIS, as a midfielder.

Career

Varbergs BoIS
On 30 November 2019, Varbergs BoIS confirmed that they had signed Tranberg.

References

External links 
 Robin Tranberg at SvFF

1993 births
Living people
Swedish footballers
Hammarby Talang FF players
Hammarby Fotboll players
Enköpings SK players
Varbergs BoIS players
GIF Sundsvall players
Dalkurd FF players
Allsvenskan players
Superettan players
Ettan Fotboll players
Association football midfielders
Footballers from Stockholm